Kensington High School may refer to:

Australia 
 Kensington Intermediate Senior High School, a secondary school in Kensington, Prince Edward Island

Canada 
 Kensington Community High School, a high school in Melbourne, Victoria

United Kingdom 
 Kensington High School was a Girls school in Kensington destroyed by a bomb in 1941, survived in part by Kensington Preparatory School.

United States 
 Kensington High School (Buffalo, New York), a former high school in Buffalo, New York
 Kensington High School (Philadelphia), a historic high school building in Philadelphia, Pennsylvania
 Hoffman-Kensington High School, a former high school in Hoffman, Minnesota